Columbia Central High School is a high school in Columbia, Tennessee, United States. The school is operated by Maury County Board of Education.

Notable alumni
 Dimeco Childress (Class of 1998) – former college basketball player
 Jim Kelly, football player
 Holly M. Kirby, Tennessee Supreme Court justice
Shaq Mason, National Football League Player, New England Patriots
 Lindsey Nelson, radio and television sportscaster
 Percy Priest, politician, journalist, teacher
 Eddie Pye, Major League Baseball player
 Dan Uggla, Major League Baseball player

References

External links
 Columbia Central High School
 List of Contest of Champions winners

Public high schools in Tennessee
Schools in Maury County, Tennessee
Buildings and structures in Columbia, Tennessee